Andreas Stefik is an associate professor of computer science at the University of Nevada, Las Vegas and the creator of Quorum, a computer programming language created with features that improve access for people with visually impairments. Stefik conducts research in the areas of software engineering, accessibility, and computer science education. He is an advocate for increasing access to computer science in K–12 education.

Education 
Stefik began his education pursuing a bachelor's degree in music at Central Washington University, but graduated with a Bachelor's in Mathematics as well as Music.  Stefik went on to receive his Master's Degree and PhD in Computer Science from Washington State University

Career and research 
As a computer science graduate student, Stefik became interested in the resources available for those who are blind or have low vision that wanted to pursue a degree in computer science.  He found there was no language currently available accessible to the blind and visually impaired, and decided to create his own. The work began as a project called Sodbeans, and over the course of ten years he developed the language Quorum with his wife, which is also auditory and therefore more accessible to people with visual impairments. In 2016, Stefik received the White House Champion of Change award for Computer Science Education for his efforts.

Stefik has also created a model for computer science education for blind or visually impaired students that as of 2016 has been deployed in almost 20 schools.

Through Stefik's research and works, he has received many grants.  Most notably, he received grants from the National Science Foundation to help build Quorum.

Notable work 

 An Empirical Investigation into Programming Language Syntax
 How do API documentation and static typing affect API usability?
 An empirical study on the impact of static typing on software maintainability

Awards 
 Java Innovation Award, Oracle Corporation, 2011
 White House Champion of Change for Computer Science Education, 2016
 Code.org Champions of Computer Science, 2018

References

External links
 The Quorum Programming Language
 Why Aren’t Computer Programming Languages Designed Better? (Fast Company, January 3, 2012)

American computer scientists
Living people
Year of birth missing (living people)
University of Nevada, Las Vegas faculty
Central Washington University alumni
Washington State University alumni